The 1972 Virginia Slims of Oklahoma City was a women's tennis tournament played on indoor carpet courts at the Frederickson Field House Arena in Oklahoma City, Oklahoma in the United States that was part of the 1972 WT Pro Tour. It was the second and last edition of the tournament and was held from February 16 through February 19, 1972. Third-seeded Rosie Casals won the singles title and earned $4,000 first-prize money.

Finals

Singles
 Rosie Casals defeated  Valerie Ziegenfuss 6–4, 6–1

Doubles
 Rosie Casals /  Billie Jean King defeated  Judy Dalton /  Françoise Dürr 6–7(4–5), 7–6(5–2), 6–2

Prize money

References

Virginia Slims of Oklahoma City
Virginia Slims of Oklahoma City
1972 in sports in Oklahoma